Al-Tawashi Mosque, is one of the historical mosques in Aleppo, Syria, dating back to the Mamluk period. It is located in al-Qasileh district of the Ancient City of Aleppo, near the Bab al-Nairab. It was built in 1348 by Safi ad-Dine Jawhar al-Allani al-Tawashi. It was renovated and enlarged in 1537 by Saadallah bin Ali bin Osman al-Malati. 

The mosque is characterized with its short minaret, the decorated columns, and its main gate topped with traditional oriental muqarnas.

References

Mosques completed in 1348
Mamluk architecture in Syria
Mosques in Aleppo
Mausoleums in Syria
14th-century mosques